Free Radio Santa Cruz (FRSC) is an unlicensed radio station in Santa Cruz, California, United States. Founded by activists Skidmarkbob Bob, Phil Free and Dennis Davey. The station has been on the air since Spring, 1995; its broadcast content is a mix of daily news, music, and cultural programs, produced both locally and nationally.

Because FRSC does not have a license from the Federal Communications Commission (FCC), the station is in open violation of US federal regulations. Free Radio Santa Cruz allows individuals in the community to have their own shows, and encourages participation through donations, membership in the broadcasting collective, and calling in live during shows.

On September 29, 2004, the station was raided by agents of the FCC, backed by federal marshals armed with assault rifles.  No arrests were made, but the agents shut down the station and physically seized nearly all of the equipment, including the transmitter, computers, mixing boards, microphones, headphones, CD players, and CDs.  The equipment was never returned.

However, with a strong showing of community support, the station was streaming online again within 48 hours and transmitting at 101.1 FM less than a month after the raid. FRSC continues to stream and broadcast 24 hours a day. As of October 2011, the station is broadcasting on 101.3 MHz.

List of Current Programming  

Democracy Now

Hour of Slack

Lava Lamps & 8-Track Theatre

The Mind's Ear

Music in the Mail

R Duck Show

Lost at Sea

The Gist of Justynn Tyme

References

KCBA Fox 35 coverage from 1995
Santa Cruz IMC coverage of FCC raid
Democracy Now! coverage of FCC raid
LA Times - Tiny Pirate Radio Station Shut Down
Good Timees article - station back on the air
City on the Hill - 15 years on the air
 18 year celebration with Henry Kaiser
Good Times article 21 years broadcasting

External links
 

Pirate radio stations in the United States
Radio stations in California
Radio stations established in 1995
Santa Cruz, California